Sachin Khedekar (born 14 May 1965) is an Indian actor and director known for his work in Hindi, Marathi, Telugu, Tamil, Malayalam and Gujarati language films. His well-known films include Kaksparsh, Astitva and Shyam Benegal's Netaji Subhas Chandra Bose: The Forgotten Hero in which he portrayed Subhas Chandra Bose. Notable TV series include  Sailaab Imtihaan and Samvidhaan in which he played B. R. Ambedkar.

Biography 
Khedekar was born on 14 May 1965 and raised in Vile Parle, Mumbai, in a Marathi deshastha Brahmin family   family. He lost his father at the age of 5. He is married to Jalpa Khedekar.

Career 
Khedekar started as a theatre artist before moving to act in movies. He started acting in plays in 1985. His first play was Vidhilikhit. He has also been in a play titled Shyam Rang in 2000. He got into Hindi television through the show Imtihaan in 1995.

Filmography

Films

Television

Samvidhaan
Imtihaan (1994)
Sailaab (1995)
Thoda Hai Thode Ki Zaroorat Hai
Teacher (1997)
Abhimaan (1999-2000) as Jaydev Mehra
Abhalmaya (2000-2001)
Your Honour (2000)
Chal Navachi Vachal Vasti
Kon Hoeel Marathi Crorepati
Aankhi ek Kahani
Shauryagatha Abhimanachi(2017)

Web series

Awards and achievements 

 Screen Award for Best Actor for the TV show Sailaab
 Awards for his roles in the film Kadachit
 Best Actor in a Historical Role award for his portrayal of Netaji Subhas Chandra Bose in the film Bose: The Forgotten Hero
 Zee Gaurav for Best Actor for the movie Mrigajal
 Zee Gaurav for Best Actor for the movie Me Shivajiraje Bhosale Boltoy
 State Award for Ghara Baher
 Won 2 Filmfare Award for Best Actor
 Nominated Zee Cine Award for Best Film

References

External links

 

1965 births
Living people
Indian male film actors
Indian male television actors
Male actors in Hindi cinema
Male actors from Mumbai
20th-century Indian male actors
Marathi actors
Male actors in Marathi cinema
Male actors in Marathi television